Nidrum is a village in the municipality of Bütgenbach in East Belgium. Nidrum is located about 2 kilometers north of Bütgenbach and has a population 854 inhabitants.

History

The history of the village can be traced back to the early 15th century.

References

Populated places in the German-speaking Community